"(I'm Not Your) Steppin' Stone" is a rock song written by Tommy Boyce and Bobby Hart. It was first recorded by Paul Revere & the Raiders and appeared on their album Midnight Ride, released in May 1966.

The song is simple musically, with a repeating verse chord progression of E major, G major, A major, and C major, and a repeating bridge in cut time of E major, G major, A major, and G major.

Monkees version

"(I'm Not Your) Steppin' Stone" is best known as a hit for the Monkees. Released in November 1966, the song became the first Monkees B-side to chart, reaching #20 on the Billboard Hot 100. Musicians featured on the recording are Micky Dolenz (lead vocal), Tommy Boyce (backing vocal), Wayne Erwin and Gerry McGee (rhythm guitar), Louis Shelton (lead guitar), Bobby Hart (Vox Continental organ),  Larry Taylor (bass), Billy Lewis (drums) and Henry Lewy (percussion).

The single, stereo album, and mono album versions contain several differences. In the stereo version, the track's title is sung just before the second verse, whereas on the single and mono album versions, this segment is left instrumental. The stereo version has an edit in the fadeout , but the mono album version does not have this edit and therefore has a longer coda. The single also does not have the edit, but it fades out earlier than does the mono album. All Monkees hits compilations through the mid-1980s used the stereo version, and afterward typically used the single version.

The Monkees' version is featured in the "romp" segments of several episodes of the group's television series. It has also been heard in episodes of shows such as The Queen's Gambit and Zoo.

Other versions
The song has been covered by many artists. Among the more notable is Modern Rocketry's version in 1983, which reached number 7 on the U.S. Hot Dance/Disco chart, and PJ & Duncan's version in 1996, which reached number 11 on the UK Singles Chart. The punk bands the Sex Pistols, State of Alert, The Trashmen, The Queers, and Minor Threat have also recorded versions of the song. It was also covered by Fereydoon Foroughi with different Persian lyrics in a song titled "Hoqqe" (حقه), also known as "Mashti Mashalla" or "Mashdi Mashalla".

References

1966 singles
Songs written by Tommy Boyce
The Monkees songs
Paul Revere & the Raiders songs
Ant & Dec songs
Song recordings produced by Tommy Boyce
Song recordings produced by Bobby Hart
1966 songs
Song recordings produced by Terry Melcher
Songs written by Bobby Hart
Protopunk songs